The Phulmoni Dasi rape case was a case of child marriage and subsequent marital rape in India in 1889, which resulted in the death of the 10-year-old girl, Phulmoni Dasi. The case led to the conviction of the husband in 1890 and triggered several legal reforms.

Although the autopsy report clearly indicated an injured vagina as the cause of death, the husband was later acquitted of the rape charge because laws on rape excluded marital rape from the purview of punitive law.

Events
Phulmoni Dasi was a ten-year-old Bengali girl with a 30-year-old husband named Hari Mohan Maiti. She died after her husband tried to consummate their marriage.

Trial
The case went to trial in the Calcutta Sessions Court on 6 July 1890. The girl's mother provided testimony against the husband. The husband was convicted under Section 338 of the Indian Penal Code for "causing grievous hurt by act endangering life or personal safety of others". Under an exception clause in Section 375 of the Indian Penal Code, introduced in 1860, sex with one's own wife was not considered as rape. As Phulmoni was of legal age and married to Maiti, he was sentenced to 12 months of hard labor. The case is known as Empress v. Hari Mohan Maiti.

Reforms
On 9 January 1891, the Viceroy of India, Lord Lansdowne presented a bill before the Council of India, which was then headed by Andrew Scoble, called the "Age of Consent". It sought to amend Section 376 of the Indian Penal Code. Previously, the age of consent had been set at 10 in 1860. After the bill was passed on 29 March 1891, the Section 376 included sex with a girl under 12 even if the person is the wife of the perpetrator, as rape.

References

1890 in India
1891 in India
1889 in India 
1889 crimes in India 
Rape in India
Marital rape
Incidents of violence against girls
Child marriage in India